Bradley Arant Boult Cummings LLP is a law firm based in Birmingham, Alabama. In addition to its Birmingham office, Bradley also has offices in Charlotte, North Carolina; Houston, Texas; Dallas, Texas; Huntsville, Alabama; Jackson, Mississippi; Montgomery, Alabama; Tampa, Florida; Washington D.C.; and Nashville, Tennessee. On December 8, 2008, Bradley announced its merger with Boult Cummings Conners & Berry, PLC, with the combined firm taking the name Bradley Arant Boult Cummings LLP. The merger became effective on January 1, 2009. The combined firm is listed as one of the National Law Journals 250 largest American law firms in its NLJ 250. The firm's chairman of the board and managing partner is Jon Skeeters. The combined firm is known for major construction company work in Europe and Asia, for multinational pharmaceutical company work in New York and California, for major insurance and financial services work in Texas, Indiana, and Alabama and for working with national tire manufacturers in Tennessee and Georgia.

History

Bradley Arant Rose & White LLP

Bradley Arant Rose & White was founded in 1870 as Hewitt & Walker in Elyton, Alabama and would later move to Birmingham, Alabama. At the time of the firm's merger with Boult Cummings it had over 250 attorneys at six offices. Noted attorney Douglas Arant joined the firm in 1923. His name was added to the firm name in 1945 and he remained with Bradley Arant Rose & White until his death in 1987.

Boult Cummings Conners & Berry, PLC

Boult Cummings Conners & Berry was founded in 1910 in Nashville, Tennessee. At the time of the firm's merger with Bradley Arant it had 100 attorneys at its one office in Nashville.

Awards 
In August 2020, Bradley Partner Jay Bender was awarded the Alabama Commendation Medal from the Alabama Army National Guard for his work on the "Honoring American Veterans in Need Act of 2019" (HAVEN Act).

References

External links
 
 See this firm's profile on Martindale.com
 Martindale.com augmented information with third-party sourced data to present a more comprehensive overview of the firm's expertise
 Organizational Profile of Bradley Arant Boult Cummings LLP at the National Law Review

Law firms established in 1871
Law firms based in Birmingham, Alabama
1871 establishments in Alabama
Privately held companies based in Alabama